Laurence Maroney (born February 5, 1985) is a former American football running back who played five seasons in the National Football League (NFL). He played college football at Minnesota and was drafted by the New England Patriots 21st overall in the 2006 NFL Draft. He also played a season for the Denver Broncos.

Early years
Maroney attended Normandy Senior High School in St. Louis, Missouri, where he gained four varsity letters in football, three in track, two in basketball, and one in baseball. In basketball, he was twice named team MVP; in track, he placed fifth at the state meet in the 200-meter dash, and third in the 100-meter dash as a senior. Maroney holds Normandy High School's single season rushing record, with 1,903 yards in 2002.

College career
At the University of Minnesota, he split duties with Marion Barber III in 2003 and 2004 and then with Gary Russell in 2005. As such, he started only 14 of 36 games, but still became the first Golden Gopher and the third in Big Ten Conference history to rush for 1,000 yards in each of his first three seasons. He gained a total of 3,933 yards with the Golden Gophers and was a two time All-Big Ten First-team selection (2004–2005). He was also selected an All-American by Pro Football Weekly and Rivals.com in 2005.

Professional career

Pre-draft

New England Patriots

2006 season
Maroney declared for the 2006 NFL Draft after the completion of his junior season and was selected in the first round with the 21st overall pick by the New England Patriots. He was the second running back selected behind Reggie Bush. He split time during the 2006 season with Corey Dillon.

Despite missing the team's preseason finale with a knee injury, Maroney played in the team's regular season opener and rushed for 86 yards in his Patriots debut. In Week 4, Maroney ran for 125 yards and two touchdowns (of 11 and 25 yards) on 15 carries against the Cincinnati Bengals, a performance that earned him both FedEx Ground NFL Player of the Week and Diet Pepsi Rookie NFL Player of the Week honors. In Week 7 against the Buffalo Bills, he was voted AFC Special Teams Player of the Week after a 74-yard kickoff return, while in Week 8 he had a 77-yard kickoff return against the Minnesota Vikings. These two were the two longest non-touchdown returns of the season outside of Antonio Cromartie's 91-yard kickoff return against the Oakland Raiders, and they gave Maroney the longest kickoff return average among all NFL players; he finished 2006 with 783 kick return yards.

In Week 11, Maroney had 82 yards rushing, and four receptions for 34 yards, including a 19-yard reception that became his first receiving touchdown. However, two weeks later, Maroney suffered torn rib cartilage against the Detroit Lions on December 3 and missed the Patriots' next two games.

2007–09
Maroney, who became the Patriots' starting running back following the release of Dillon in the offseason, missed three games in October with a groin injury, and rushed for 835 yards in the Patriots' undefeated 2007 regular season. In the playoffs, Maroney became a bigger factor for the Patriots, compiling 244 rushing yards and two touchdowns in two games before playing in Super Bowl XLII. In that game, Maroney had 14 carries for 36 yards with a one-yard touchdown in a loss against the New York Giants.

On October 20, 2008, Maroney's season ended when he was placed on injured reserve due to a shoulder injury, later disclosed by Maroney to be a broken bone suffered in a game against the New York Jets on September 14. He would miss two of the Patriots' next three games and finished the season with 93 rushing yards.

Maroney played in 15 games in 2009, starting five. He finished the season with 757 rushing yards and nine touchdowns and averaged 3.9 yards per carry.

Denver Broncos
After he was inactive for the Patriots' 2010 season opener against the Cincinnati Bengals, Maroney was traded to the Denver Broncos on September 14, 2010. The Patriots received a 2011 fourth-round selection in return, while the Broncos received a 2011 sixth-round pick from the Patriots. On January 18, 2011 Maroney was arrested on weapons charges in St. Louis, however, he was released without charge, as he had  a permit to carry a concealed weapon. On April 3, 2011 Maroney was not re-signed by the Broncos.

References

1985 births
Living people
Players of American football from St. Louis
American football running backs
Minnesota Golden Gophers football players
New England Patriots players
Denver Broncos players